Middletown Valley, also historically known as Catoctin Valley, is a valley in western Frederick County in the state of Maryland.

Geography
It is bound to the west by South Mountain, to the east by Catoctin Mountain, to the south by the Potomac River and to the north by the convergence of South Mountain and Catoctin Mountain, south of Quirauk Mountain.  Geographically, it can be considered an extension of the Loudoun Valley which lies below the Potomac in Virginia.  The valley derives its name from Middletown, the largest town in the Valley.

The use of the Catoctin Valley terminology was prevalent up through the American Civil War but afterwards was abandoned due to confusion between it and the northern portion of the Loudoun Valley also referred to as Catoctin Valley.

References

Valleys of Maryland
Landforms of Frederick County, Maryland